The commune of Aïn Azel is fifty kilometres south of Sétif in Algeria, and is at the frontier between Sétif Province and Batna Province. The population of Aïn Azel is estimated to be around 37,970 people (2008).

Origin of the name
The name "Aïn Azel" may come from the Berber "Azzel" which means "he who runs" or Azel which means "precious". This name, together with the Arabic word Aïn ("Fountain") may therefore mean "the fountain that runs" or "the precious fountain". The town was known as Ampère between 1895 and 1962.

Aïn Azel was the site of a mining catastrophe on June 2, 1990, which resulted in the death of approximately twenty workers when a zinc and lead mine was flooded.

Geography
Latitude: 35°82 north
Longitude: 5°51 east
Altitude: 935 metres

Aïn Azel is virtually surrounded by mountains:
 Djebel Loumassa and Djebel Sekrine to the west
 Djebel Gatiane to the south
 Djebel Lehcana to the south-east
 Djebel Kaläaoun to the east

References 

Communes of Sétif Province